In mathematics, specifically in category theory, Day convolution is an operation on functors that can be seen as a categorified version of function convolution.  It was first introduced by Brian Day in 1970  in the general context of enriched functor categories.  Day convolution acts as a tensor product for a monoidal category structure on the category of functors  over some monoidal category .

Definition 
Let  be a monoidal category enriched over a symmetric monoidal closed category . Given two functors , we define their Day convolution as the following coend.

If  is symmetric, then  is also symmetric. We can show this defines an associative monoidal product.

References

External links 

Category theory